Dawn Riley (born July 21, 1964) is an American sailor, and a pioneer in the sport of sailboat racing. She is in the National Sailing Hall of Fame and the international America's Cup Hall of Fame.  The youngest and only female to be a 'dual-famer' this.  She sailed in four America's Cup races and two Whitbread Round the World races.  She was the watch captain on Maiden, the first all-women's entry in the Whitbread race, and was the team captain of the first all-women's team in the America's Cup. She later established the America True Foundation to encourage youth participation in sailing. Since 2010 she has run Oakcliff Sailing dedicated to Building American Leaders Through Sailing

Early life 
Born in 1964, Dawn Riley grew up in Detroit, Michigan. Her parents were Chuck and Prudence Riley, and she was the eldest of three children.  She began racing sailboats at age 13, and became Commodore of the Sea Scout program at the North Star Sail Club on Lake St. Clair.  She also participated in track and field and is the Discus record holder at L’Anse Creuse High School.

Sailing career
In 1989-90, Riley joined the crew of Maiden, skippered by Tracy Edwards, which was the first all-women's boat to participate in the Whitbread Round the World sailboat race (now known as The Ocean Race). Riley was the watch captain, diver and engineer. They sailed a very competitive race, and gained significant media exposure, raising the visibility of women in the sport.

Riley then raced in the America’s Cup on the America team in 1992. She was the pit man in the Defender Series, becoming the first woman to have an active racing role aboard an America's Cup contender.  Bill Koch was the skipper and patron of the team, which then went on to win the 1992 America's Cup.

The following year, Riley was the skipper of Heineken, an all-women's entry in the 1993-94 Whitbread race, the only all women's boat in the race. Riley flew in to Uruguay to take on the skipper duties after Nance Frank stepped down, following a dispute among the team members on  the first leg of the race. She later wrote a book about the experience, entitled Taking the Helm.

For the 1995 America's Cup, Riley was the Team Captain for the all-women's team sailing on Mighty Mary, in the Defender Series. Mighty Mary, part of the America Syndicate, was sponsored by Bill Koch. Leading by a significant margin going into the last leg, Riley and the Mighty Mary team lost their wind, and Dennis Conner on Stars and Stripes was able to overtake them for the win in the final of the 1995 Citizen's Cup.

In 2000 Riley created and led America True, a coed team with a very modest budget that surprised all experts by outracing many of the top teams in individual races of the round robin and Semifinal competitions, including New York Yacht Club's entry and Dennis Conner's Stars & Stripes. The America True team had one of the 1st fully active foundations as a part of the campaign. The America True Foundation worked as a public foundation making sailing accessible with programs across the United States getting at-risk-kids out on the water. In 2021 it was folded into Oakcliff sailing and established a large scholarship fund specifically for graduates of the many community sailing programs that America True helped to create.

Riley served on the board of the Women's Sports Foundation from 1999–2006 , and as the President for 2003 and 2004. She is also politically active in the Democratic Party.  She is a motivational speaker, and has traveled widely, speaking about leadership and team building.

In 2007 Riley continued to work in the America's Cup, as the General Manager of the French Team for the America's Cup, Areva Challenge.  In 2010, Riley became the executive director of the Oakcliff Sailing Center.  Oakcliff's mission is to improve the sport of sailing in the United States, and it operates out of Oyster Bay, New York with a fleet of nearly fifty racing boats, including the largest collection of Match 40s in the world.

Awards 
 BMW Foundation Young Leader
 World Champion – 2003 One Ton Cup
 World Champion – Women's World Cup 1992
 US Rolex Yachtswoman of the Year 1999
 Michigan State University – Alumni of the year
 Michigander of the Year – 1999

References

External links
 
 America True
 

1964 births
Living people
American female sailors (sport)
Michigan State Spartans sailors
US Sailor of the Year
Volvo Ocean Race sailors
1992 America's Cup sailors
1995 America's Cup sailors
2000 America's Cup sailors
Women's Sports Foundation executives
21st-century American women